Harry James Barber (March 29, 1875 – February 11, 1959) was a Canadian politician. He was elected to the House of Commons of Canada in the 1925 election as a Member of the historical Conservative Party in the riding of Fraser Valley. He was re-elected in 1926, 1930, 1935 and defeated in 1940. Prior to his federal political experience, he was mayor of Chilliwack, British Columbia between 1914 and 1916 and also Chairman of the Chilliwack school board for eight years.

References

External links
 

1875 births
1959 deaths
Conservative Party of Canada (1867–1942) MPs
Members of the House of Commons of Canada from British Columbia
People from Caledon, Ontario
Mayors of Chilliwack
Canadian pharmacists
British Columbia school board members